Locketiella is a genus of Southeast Asian dwarf spiders that was first described by Alfred Frank Millidge & A. Russell-Smith in 1992.  it contains only two species, both found in Indonesia: L. merretti and L. parva.

See also
 List of Linyphiidae species (I–P)

References

Araneomorphae genera
Linyphiidae
Spiders of Asia